"Sick of It" is the first single from the 2013 album Rise from the Christian rock band Skillet. The single was released on SoundCloud on April 8, 2013 and was released in the iTunes Store on April 9, and was released to US rock radio on April 23.

Meaning 

During an interview prior to the full album's release, Lead Singer John Cooper stated, "We see something like the Boston bombing and it's shocking, but not as shocking perhaps as it might have once been because of all the terrible things that happen today. And I think, 'you have got to be kidding me!' We are all sick of all this tragedy. The song is very angry sounding and very aggressive but that's real – that's how I feel about these things."

Charts

Personnel
John Cooper - lead vocals, bass guitar
Korey Cooper - rhythm guitar, keyboards, backing vocals
Jen Ledger - drums, backing vocals
Seth Morrison – lead guitar

References

Skillet (band) songs
2013 singles
Songs written by John Cooper (musician)
Song recordings produced by Howard Benson
Atlantic Records singles
2013 songs
Word Records singles